Norman Ross Adler  (born 13 December 1944) is an Australian business executive, was the managing director of Santos Limited from 1986 to 2000. He also chaired the board of Austrade (2001–2006).

Education
Adler went to the University of Melbourne and graduated with Bachelor of commerce in 1966. He received an MBA from Columbia University and University of Adelaide.

Career

In 1990, Adler was made director of the Commonwealth Bank of Australia, after holding various management positions in other companies for fifteen years. He left the position in 2004.

Honours and awards
Companion of the Order of Australia (AC), 11 June 2007
For service to business and commerce, particularly through the promotion of international trade and as a contributor to company and commercialisation development in Australia, to the community through administrative roles with educational institutions, and as a supporter of the arts.
Officer of the Order of Australia (AO),  26 January 1999
For service to business and commerce, to the promotion of the arts in South Australia, and to the community.
Centenary Medal, 1 January 2001
For outstanding service to Australia's international trade

References

1944 births
Living people
20th-century Australian businesspeople
21st-century Australian businesspeople
Columbia Business School alumni
Companions of the Order of Australia